Strand: Under the Dark Cloth is a Canadian documentary film directed by John Walker. A portrait of photographer and filmmaker Paul Strand, it premiered at the 1989 Festival of Festivals before being released theatrically in 1990.

The film won the Genie Award for Best Feature Length Documentary at the 11th Genie Awards.

References

External links
 

1989 films
1989 documentary films
Canadian documentary films
Best Documentary Film Genie and Canadian Screen Award winners
Films directed by John Walker
1980s English-language films
1980s Canadian films